The Swannay Brewery is situated in Orkney, Scotland. It was founded as Highland Brewing Company in 2005 by Rob Hill, formerly of the Orkney Brewery and Moorhouse's Brewery. It is situated in the old Creamery at Swannay Farms, Orkney Mainland.

Currently at least six beers are brewed all year round: Orkney Best, Dark Munro, Scapa Special, St Magnus Ale, Orkney IPA and Orkney Blast. There are also rotating seasonal ales, these include Light Munro, Island Hopping, Orkney Stout, Orkney Porter and Old Norway. Dark Munro was the CAMRA 2007 Champion Beer of Scotland. Scapa Special was the CAMRA 2008 Champion Beer of Scotland. Orkney Blast was the CAMRA 2010 Champion Beer of Scotland. Orkney IPA was the CAMRA 2012 Champion Beer of Scotland with Orkney Best getting the silver medal. Their Scapa Bere is brewed from bere, an ancient six-row barley cultivated mainly on Orkney.

In 2015 the brewery rebranded from Highland Brewing Company to Swannay Brewery.

References

External links

Official site
RateBeer
BeerAdvocate

Breweries in Scotland
Companies based in Orkney
2005 establishments in Scotland
British companies established in 2005
Food and drink companies established in 2005